The Cerbillona, culminating at  in the massif du Vignemale, constitutes the south-western high fringe of the glacier d'Ossoue with the Pic central (3,235 m) and the Clot de la Hount (3,289 m). The Montferrat (3,219 m) constitutes the southern fringe. The Pique longue (3,298 m) is the highest summit of the massif and also of the French Pyrenees.

Mountains of the Pyrenees
Mountains of Hautes-Pyrénées
Mountains of Aragon
Pyrenean three-thousanders